Bakırlı is a village in the Seben District of Bolu Province in Turkey. Its population is 51 (2021).

References

Villages in Seben District